Socialist Laws may refer to one of the following: 
Socialist law
Anti-Socialist Laws